Alessandro Cattelan: One Simple Question is a 2022 Italian documentary series created by television host and personality Alessandro Cattelan. It was released internationally on Netflix on 18 March 2022.

Episodes

See also
List of Italian television series

References

External links
 

2020s documentary television series
Italian documentary television series
Italian-language Netflix original programming
Netflix original documentary television series